Major Leagues is the final EP by American indie rock band Pavement. It was released on October 12, 1999, on Matador Records.  To date, it is their final release of original material excluding reissues.

Background 
The EP contains seven tracks: A radio edit of the Terror Twilight version of "Major Leagues." Two "Spiral Stairs" songs: "Your Time to Change," and "Stub Your Toe," which were recorded by Pavement's original drummer, Gary Young (lead singer Stephen Malkmus most likely did not attend these sessions due to his feud with Young). A demo of "Major Leagues" recorded alone by Malkmus. "Decouvert de Soleil," which features Stephen Malkmus switching back between English and French.  The sound and instrumentation of the song is very similar to that of the "Major Leagues" demo, so it could be safe to assume that the singer recorded this track alone as well. (One CD version contains the information that both these songs were recorded "in vista st. clair by s.m.", Malkmus' alias). Covers of Echo & the Bunnymen's "The Killing Moon" and The Fall's "The Classical" from a 1997 BBC session.  The latter is introduced as "an old family favorite."

Track listing

Personnel

Pavement 

 Stephen Malkmus – lead vocals, guitar
 Scott Kannberg – lead vocals, guitar
 Mark Ibold – bass guitar
 Steve West – drums
 Bob Nastanovich – percussion, backing vocals

Additional musicians 

 Gary Young – drums

References

External links
 

1999 EPs
Albums produced by Nigel Godrich
Matador Records EPs
Pavement (band) albums